Marcel the Shell with Shoes On is a 2021 American independent live-action/stop-motion animated mockumentary comedy-drama film directed by Dean Fleischer Camp (in his feature directorial debut), with a screenplay by Fleischer Camp, Jenny Slate and Nick Paley from a story by Fleischer Camp, Slate, Paley and Elisabeth Holm. It is based on and serves both as a direct stand-alone sequel and prequel to the series of shorts of the same name written by Slate and Fleischer Camp. Slate reprises her voice role as Marcel, an anthropomorphic shell living with his grandmother Connie. Fleischer Camp, Rosa Salazar, Thomas Mann, Lesley Stahl, and Isabella Rossellini also star. The film follows Marcel, a shell who lives with his grandmother, Connie, after posting a short film online bringing Marcel millions of passionate fans and a new hope of reuniting with his long-lost family.

Marcel the Shell with Shoes On premiered at the Telluride Film Festival on September 3, 2021, and began a limited release in the United States by A24 on June 24, 2022, before its wide release on July 15, 2022, to critical acclaim and was nominated in the Academy Award for Best Animated Feature category.

Plot
Following the end of his marriage, documentary filmmaker Dean moves into an Airbnb and discovers Marcel, a one-inch-tall talking shell living in the home with his grandmother, Nana Connie, and Alan, his pet ball of lint. 

Inspired by Marcel's whimsicality, resourcefulness, and fascination with the world, Dean begins filming Marcel's daily activities, most of which consist of gathering resources from the backyard in order to support himself and Nana Connie. Connie is wise but she has some dementia. She tends to her garden assisted by insects she has befriended. Marcel and Connie share their mutual love of 60 Minutes and Lesley Stahl. 

After Dean uploads his first video about Marcel to YouTube, it quickly becomes a cultural phenomenon. Marcel is both flattered and overwhelmed with his newfound popularity, lamenting that his family is not around to celebrate it with him. Marcel explains to Dean that there used to be an entire community of shells on the property, including Marcel's mother, father, brother, and aunt.  The shells would take shelter in a sock drawer when the house's previous owners, Mark and Larissa, started knocking objects over while fighting. 

Following one fight, Mark accidentally packs the shells into his suitcase while moving out, leaving Marcel and Connie as the only ones left on the property. Dean helps Marcel produce a livestream on the internet asking for help in locating his family. The livestream gains a substantial number of viewers, but after Marcel shares his location with viewers, the house becomes a popular area for influencers. Marcel becomes dismayed after realizing most of the people who saw his videos are fans, desperate to be associated with him but largely uninterested in helping him.

The constant attention to the house quickly begins to bother Marcel, who is worried about Connie's deteriorating health. Marcel convinces Dean to drive him around the city in search of Mark's car, but is overwhelmed to discover how large and vast the world outside his house really is. Realizing that the world is too big to likely discover the car on his own, a discouraged Marcel returns home to find Connie has fallen off the top of a washing machine and cracked her shell. Marcel tends to her wounds and grows more protective of Connie.

60 Minutes reaches out to Marcel in the hopes of doing a cover story. Despite Dean's encouragement, Marcel is reluctant to accept the offer, concerned with what the large production crew and more attention to the house would do to Connie's health. Marcel tells Dean he will not accept the interview until Connie is fully recovered. Dean confides this information to a fast-deteriorating Connie. Wanting Marcel to live a meaningful life of his own, Connie pretends to show signs of improvement around Marcel while encouraging him to accept the interview. Despite strong reservations, Marcel eventually agrees to the interview, believing it may help him find his family.

Connie's health continues to worsen as the day of the interview approaches. Connie and Marcel watch as the 60 Minutes crew sets up in the living room and are starstruck upon seeing Lesley Stahl in person. Marcel and Dean both participate in the interview. Upon its completion, Marcel and Dean struggle to find Connie before realizing she died while their segment was being filmed. Marcel buries Connie in her garden and grieves her. Dean signs a lease for a new apartment.

60 Minutes calls Dean requesting additional filming after making new discoveries regarding the whereabouts of Larissa. The segment airs, showing that they were able to locate Larissa in Guatemala. Larissa then brings the 60 Minutes crew to Mark's house, where she and Mark get into an argument. Marcel urges Dean and the crew to check in Mark's sock drawer, where the entire shell community is discovered. They reunite in the Airbnb with Marcel, who is able to give Connie a proper funeral. Dean moves into his new apartment and begins dating again. Reunited with his family, Marcel confides to Dean that he often finds himself going to the Laundry Room window alone, and feeling the wind blow through his shell. Marcel shows Dean the sound it produces, remarking on its beauty as he stares out the window.

Cast 
 Jenny Slate as the voice of Marcel
 Dean Fleischer Camp as Dean, a documentarian
 Isabella Rossellini as the voice of Nana Connie, Marcel's grandmother
 Rosa Salazar as Larissa Geller
 Thomas Mann as Mark Booth
 Lesley Stahl as herself
 Shari Finkelstein as 60 Minutes producer
 Sarah Thyre as the voice of Catherine, Marcel's mother 
 Andy Richter as the voice of Mario, Marcel's father
 Nathan Fielder as the voice of Justin, Marcel's brother
 Jessi Klein as the voice of Judy, Marcel's aunt
 Peter Bonerz as the voice of The Maestro
 Jamie Leonhart as Shell Family (voices)
 Conan O'Brien as himself
 Brian Williams as himself
 Jesse Cilio as Darwin

Production 
Chiodo Bros. Production (known for the 1988 cult classic Killer Klowns from Outer Space) led animation, with Edward Chiodo as animation producer and Kirsten Lepore as animation director. Stephen Chiodo was the film's supervising animation director. Bianca Cline led live action cinematography, while Eric Adkins (Mars Attacks!, The PJs) led stop-motion cinematography.

Music

Release
The film premiered at the Telluride Film Festival on September 3, 2021. It was also shown at SXSW in March 2022.

In November 2021, A24 acquired the distribution rights. The film was released in select theaters in the United States on June 24, 2022, before releasing nationwide on July 15. The film was released on shop.a24films.com on  Blu-Ray & 4k Ultra HD and in Canada on standard dvd+digital and Blu-Ray and everywhere digitally on September 5, 2022.

The film premiered on February 17, 2023 by Focus Features and Universal Pictures in the United Kingdom.

Reception

Box office
In the United States and Canada, the film made $169,606 from six theaters in its opening weekend. It then made $262,022 from 22 theaters in its second and $322,167 from 48 theaters in its third. Playing in 153 theaters the following weekend, the film added another $567,918, bringing its four-week running total to $1.7 million. The film expanded to 590 theatres in the second wide weekend, grossing $874,302 with the average revenue on $1,481, finishing eleventh at the box office. It continued to gross $671,361 from 821 theaters in its third wide weekend and $345,484 from 498 theaters in its fourth wide weekend, both times finishing fourteenth at the box office.

Critical response
On the review aggregator Rotten Tomatoes, 98% of 182 reviews are positive, with an average rating of 8.2/10. The critical consensus reads, "Poignant, profound, and utterly heartwarming, Marcel the Shell with Shoes On is animated entertainment with real heart." Metacritic, which uses a weighted average, assigned the film a score of 80 out of 100 based on 42 critics, indicating "generally favorable reviews".

Accolades 
On July 20, 2022, Dean Fleischer Camp said that even with the film having animated characters living and interacting with a live-action world, it will be eligible for consideration to be nominated for Best Animated Feature at the 95th Academy Awards in 2023. He went on to say that in order for it to be considered, he and A24 will have to submit documentation to prove that it has met the requirements in which "animation must figure in no less than 75 percent of the picture's running time. In addition, a narrative animated film must have a significant number of characters animated." On November 9, 2022, the Academy of Motion Picture Arts and Sciences officially deemed the film eligible for consideration in the Animated Feature category. It was also nominated for a Golden Globe Award for Best Animated Feature Film, but lost to Guillermo del Toro's Pinocchio.

Notes

References

External links
 
 Official screenplay

American prequel films
2021 animated films
2021 comedy-drama films
2021 directorial debut films
2020s children's comedy films
A24 (company) films
American animated comedy films
American films with live action and animation
Annie Award winners
Films about families
Films using stop-motion animation
Features based on short films
Molluscs in popular culture
Seashells in art
2020s mockumentary films
2020s English-language films
2020s American animated films
Films directed by Dean Fleischer Camp
2020s stop-motion animated films
American sequel films
2021 independent films